The International Congress of Actuaries (ICA) is a conference held under the auspices of the International Actuarial Association every four years. The most recent conference was the 31st Congress, held in Berlin, Germany from 4 to 8 June 2018.  The 33rd Congress will be held in Sydney, Australia in 2023 and the 34th in Tokyo, Japan in 2026.

Past congresses

 1895 Brussels, Belgium
 1898 London, United Kingdom
 1900 Paris, France
 1903 New York, United States
 1906 Berlin, Germany
 1909 Vienna, Austria
 1912 Amsterdam, Netherlands
 1915 St. Petersburg, Russia  (organised but not held)
 1927 London, United Kingdom
 1930 Stockholm, Sweden
 1934 Rome, Italy
 1937 Paris, France
 1940 Lucerne, Switzerland (organised but not held; papers published)
 1951 Scheveningen, Netherlands
 1954 Madrid, Spain
 1957 New York, United States and Toronto, Canada
 1960 Brussels, Belgium
 1964 London and Edinburgh, United Kingdom
 1968 Munich, Germany
 1972 Oslo, Norway
 1976 Tokyo, Japan
 1980 Zurich and Lausanne, Switzerland
 1984 Sydney, Australia
 1988 Helsinki, Finland
 1992 Montreal, Canada
 1995 Brussels, Belgium
 1998 Birmingham, United Kingdom
 2002 Cancún, Mexico
 2006 Paris, France
 2010 Cape Town, South Africa
 2014 Washington, D.C., United States
 2018 Berlin, Germany

Future congresses 

 2023 Sydney, Australia
 2026 Tokyo, Japan

External links

 ICA 2006 Paris
 ICA 2010 Cape Town
 ICA 2014 Washington
 ICA 2018 Berlin
 ICA 2023 Sydney

International conferences
Actuaries
Academic conferences